3-Methoxymorphinan is a levomethorphan metabolite that has been shown to produce local anesthetic effects. It is the CYP3A4 metabolite of dextromethorphan, and is itself metabolized by the liver enzyme CYP2D6.

See also 
 3-hydroxymorphinan
 Dextrorphan
 Dextromethorphan
 Levomethorphan
 Morphinan

References 

Morphinans
Human drug metabolites